Anna Sebastian "Pete" Compton (September 28, 1889 – February 3, 1978), was a Major League Baseball outfielder who played in parts of six seasons from  to  with five major league teams. In all, Compton would spend 20 years in professional baseball, including two seasons as a player-manager.

Life and career
Compton was born in San Marcos, Texas. After three seasons in the minors (beginning as a 19-year-old in 1909), Compton hit .352 for Battle Creek, Michigan-based Battle Creek Crickets in the Class C Southern Michigan League before being signed to the St. Louis Browns, where he hit .271 in 28 games. 

Compton spent all of 1912 in St. Louis, splitting time in left and right field and also logging 34 games as a pinch hitter. Compton batted .280 but committed nine errors in left field, fourth-worst in the AL despite spending only 49 games there.

After spending the next three seasons bouncing up and down between the Browns and their top minor league team in Kansas City, Compton went across town and jumped to the St. Louis Terriers of the Federal League. After playing just two games with the Terriers (both ends of a doubleheader on July 24), an injunction forced Compton to return to Kansas City; he was then was sold to the Boston Braves in August, remaining there for the rest of the 1915 season. The following year, the Braves sold Compton to the Pittsburgh Pirates in July, only to have Pete return to Boston 11 days later; he hit just .184 in the major leagues, but managed a .291 mark for Louisville. After spending the entire 1917 season in the minors, Louisville sold Compton to the New York Giants in 1918, where he hit just .217 in 21 games; this would be his final big-league stop.

Although his MLB days were done, Compton would stay in the game for another decade; he played for four Pacific Coast League clubs from 1919-23, then headed south to Houston of the Texas League, where he took over as manager near the end of the 1925 season. After stops in Ft. Worth, Wichita and Denver, Compton headed in 1928 to Miami, Arizona, managing the Miami Miners of the Arizona State League to a 30-38 record and batting .310. After the season, Compton finally retired after two decades in pro ball.

Compton returned to Kansas City, where he died on February 3, 1978, at the age of 88.

External links

1889 births
1978 deaths
Major League Baseball outfielders
Baseball players from Texas
St. Louis Browns players
New York Giants (NL) players
St. Louis Terriers players
Boston Braves players
Pittsburgh Pirates players
Lancaster Lanks players
Beeville Orange Growers players
Battle Creek Crickets players
Kansas City Blues (baseball) players
Louisville Colonels (minor league) players
New Orleans Pelicans (baseball) players
Seattle Rainiers players
Los Angeles Angels (minor league) players
Sacramento Senators players
San Francisco Seals (baseball) players
Houston Buffaloes managers
Houston Buffaloes players
Fort Worth Panthers players
Wichita Izzies players
Denver Bears players
Miami Miners players